FabricLive.73 is a DJ mix album by electronic artist Pangaea. It was released in 2014, as part of the FabricLive Mix Series.

Track listing

References

External links
FabricLive.73 at Fabric

Fabric (club) albums
2014 compilation albums